A Big Country (1968 - 1991) was an Australian television documentary series produced by the Australian Broadcasting Corporation (ABC).

History
The series' purpose was to document life in rural Australia for the information of Australian city dwellers.  The stories were identified by ABC staff working in rural areas.

Based in Sydney (part of the ABC Rural division), the production team consisted of a producer, a reporter, a sound recordist and camera operator, possibly accompanied by  trainees. 370 episodes each of 30 minutes were produced in 32 series between 1968 and 1991 and were screened on the ABC network in prime time to high ratings.

The series also spawned a series of books based on the stories in the episodes.

Awards
The series won numerous awards including:
 Logie Awards of 1976
 Logie Awards of 1979
 Logie Awards of 1981

References

Australian Broadcasting Corporation original programming
1960s Australian documentary television series
1968 Australian television series debuts
1991 Australian television series endings
1970s Australian documentary television series
1980s Australian documentary television series
1990s Australian documentary television series